The Gala-Salvador Dalí Foundation is a private cultural institution founded by the painter Salvador Dalí with the mission of promoting his artistic, cultural and intellectual œuvre. (The foundation is also named after his wife, Gala Dalí.)

Created on 23 December 1983 at Púbol Castle, Dalí presided over and directed the foundation in person from the outset. His death on 23 January 1989 inaugurated a period of transition until, in 1991, the board of the foundation appointed Ramon Boixadós Malé president.

The Foundation's museums
 Dalí Theater-Museum (Figueres)
 Dalí-Jewels (Figueres)
 Home-Museum Salvador Dalí (Portlligat)
 Home-Museum Gala-Dalí Castle (Púbol)

External links

The Gala-Salvador Dalí Foundation
Museu Salvador Dalí a St. Petersburg (Florida)

Arts foundations based in Europe
Salvador Dalí
1983 establishments in Spain